Madonna and Child enthroned with St. John the Baptist and St. Augustine is an oil painting by Greek painter Ioannis Permeniates.  He was from Crete living in Venice.  He was active during the first part of the 16th century.  There are dozens of works attributed to the artist.  He is a cross-over artist who painted in both the maniera greca and the Venetian style.  Other similar artists were El Greco and Michael Damaskinos. Ioannis Permeniates's work was influenced by Vittore Carpaccio and Giovanni Bellini.  His most notable painting is the Madonna and Child enthroned with St. John the Baptist and St. Augustine.  Many Italian artists painted the same subject matter.  The most famous painting depicting the subjects is the Madonna and Child with St John the Baptist and St Augustine by Petrus Perusinus.  The Permeniates is part of the collection Museo Correr in Venice, Italy.

Description
The work is an oil painting on panel with dimensions of 126 cm x 116 cm (49.6 in x 45.6 in).  It was created in the early part of the 16th century. The painting depicts the Nursing Madonna and Child enthroned. Two angles are holding a holy cloth behind the Holy Mother.  The central angel is crowning her.  She is rewarded for her holy sacrifice while she is nurturing Jesus.   The floor below the Virgin is tiled with elaborate colors.  The platform is decorated with circular and diamond shapes.

Saint Augustine is dressed in elaborate attire.  He is wearing a mitre with jewels.  He holds a gold ornamented scepter.  His stole is decorated with images of religious figures.  He is holding a religious book.  On the contrary, John the Baptist  is portrayed as a humble servant.  He holds a message in latin Ecce Agnus Dei (Behold the Lamb of God).  His attire and presentation are the common humble depiction of John the Baptist.  Although the painting is created in the Italian style it does not escape its Byzantine charm.   

The painter tries to adopt a landscape and captures colors and stimuli similar to Vittore Carpaccio and Giovanni Bellini.  Permeniates aims at the perfection of the line and immobilizes everything in a magical aura, placed out of time, not without its subtle charm, as if castles, knights, animals, plants, and stones had crystallized under an unnatural light.  The painting also features camels which are common to his paintings.  He also painted another piece featuring the same subjects but included  Saint Jerome and Saint Andrew.

Gallery

References 

16th-century paintings
Paintings in Venice
Cretan Renaissance paintings
Collections of the Museo Correr